Hoerner or Hörner is a surname that may refer to:

Spelled as Hoerner:
 Dan Hoerner (born 1969), American guitarist, vocalist, and author
 Dick Hoerner (1922–2010), American football player
 Hanna von Hoerner (1942–2014), German astrophysicist and businessperson
 Joe Hoerner (1936–1996), American baseball player
 John Hoerner (born 1939), British businessman.
 Nico Hoerner (born 1997), American baseball player
 Sebastian von Hoerner (1919–2003), German astrophysicist and radio astronomer
 Sighard F. Hoerner, engineer and writer on aerodynamics

Spelled as Hörner:
 Johan Hörner (1711–1763), Swedish-Danish painter
 Silke Hörner (born 1965), German breast stroke swimmer